Robert De Middeleir (26 August 1938 – 8 July 2016) was a Belgian cyclist. Professional from 1962 to 1967, he notably won the Omloop Het Nieuwsblad in 1962.

Honours 
1961
 2nd in the Nationale Sluitingsprijs
1962
 Omloop Het Nieuwsblad
 2nd in the Brabantse Pijl
 2nd in the Kuurne–Brussels–Kuurne
1964
 Nokere Koerse
1966
 2nd in the Kuurne–Brussels–Kuurne
 3rd in the Circuit du Houtland - Torhout

Results in the grands tours

Tour de France 
 1962 : retired (14th stage)

External links 
 

Belgian male cyclists
1938 births
2016 deaths
Cyclists from East Flanders
People from Lede, Belgium